Montana Highway 135 (MT 135) is a  state highway in western Montana.  It begins at Interstate 90 (I-90) in St. Regis and ends at MT 200 near Paradise. The highway runs along the bank of the Clark Fork River and through Lolo National Forest.

History

From 1960 to 1978, a secondary route ran on the modern route of MT 135. It was a connection between US 10 and US 10A and later Montana Highway 200. There was a toll ferry cross the Clark Fork River.

Route description

MT 135 begins in St. Regis at exit 33 along I-90.  Almost immediately, it comes to a four-way stop where it intersects the former U.S. Highway 10.  From there, the highway heads to the north and northeast through Lolo National Forest and along the northern bank of the Clark Fork River.  A line of the Montana Rail Link railroad runs parallel to the highway. Near its midpoint, MT 135 crosses the river and passes beneath the railroad; from there, the road and railroad run along opposite banks of the river.  As the river winds, the highway follows closely; near Quinn, the river and road straighten.  Just before the highway ends, it exits Lolo National Forest.  The highway ends a couple miles east of Paradise at MT 200.  Nearby is the mouth of the Clark Fork River, which empties into the Flathead River.

Major intersections

See also

References

External links

 
 

135
Transportation in Mineral County, Montana
Transportation in Sanders County, Montana